Sari Qurkhan (also Romanized as Sārī Qūrkhān) is a village in Karaftu Rural District, in the Central District of Takab County, West Azerbaijan Province, Iran. At the 2006 census, its population was 151, in 30 families.

References 

Populated places in Takab County